Anne Scan is a cargo ship registered in Antigua and Barbuda which was detained in Greenore, Republic of Ireland on 27 October 2009 when over €50,000,000 worth of cigarettes were discovered on board.

History
Anne Scan was built by Slovenskie Lodenice AG. She was launched in 1996 and completed on 1 March 1997. Her original name was Lebasee. In 2006 she was renamed Moldova and in 2007 she was renamed Herford and then Anne Scan. She is owned by  NORDICA Schiffahrts GmbH & Co. KG, Haren, Germany and managed by HELD Bereederungs GmbH & Co. KG, Haren.  The vessel is operated by Scan-Trans. Her port of registry is St. John, Antigua and Barbuda.

On 27 October 2009, Anne Scan was seized by Irish authorities for allegedly being involved in a cigarette smuggling operation. An estimated €50 million was found on board the ship when it was seized in Greenore County Louth by Revenue Customs Service supported by An Garda Síochána, making it the largest seizure of contraband cigarettes in the European Union. The ship was moved to Dublin Port for unloading. It was chartered to take cargo from the Philippines and was to be returned to her owners after the trip.

Description
Anne Scan has a blue hull and white superstructure.

Identification
Anne Scan has IMO Number 9145126, MMSI Number 304256000 and uses the callsign V2IA8.

References

1996 ships
Cargo ships of Antigua and Barbuda
Maritime incidents in 2009